Lee Jeong-hyeop (or  ; born 24 June 1991) is a South Korean footballer who plays as striker for Gangwon FC in the K League 1.

Career
He was selected by Busan IPark in 2013 K League 1 Draft. He scored his first two goals for Busan in the league match against Jeonbuk Hyundai on 1 June 2013. The goals came in Lee's twelfth appearance for the club, and they were his only goals of the campaign.

Lee transferred to military team Sangju Sangmu for the 2014 season to complete his mandatory military service. He scored four goals in his debut season, but could not prevent Sangju from being relegated as the bottom club in the division.

After completing his national service, Lee made a loan move to K League 1 side Ulsan Hyundai in 2016. Having only scored four goals for the club, he returned to his parent club for the 2017 season. After a successful season in which Lee recorded a personal best tally of ten goals, Lee again went out on loan, this time to Japanese team Shonan Bellmare. However, he failed to make an impact for the Japanese club and returned to Korea the following year. In 2019, Lee had his best season to date, scoring 13 goals for Busan to help them secure promotion to the K League 1.

International career
In December 2014, Lee was surprisingly included in South Korea's squad for the 2015 AFC Asian Cup as an uncapped player. He made his debut for the Taegeuk Warriors in a pre-tournament friendly against Saudi Arabia, scoring his first international goal as the Koreans ran out 2–0 winners. In South Korea's final group game, Lee scored the winning goal against tournament hosts Australia to secure first place in Group A. On 26 January 2015, Lee scored the opening goal of South Korea's 2–0 semi-final defeat of Iraq to put the nation into the Asian Cup final for the first time since 1988.

International goals 
 Results list South Korea's goal tally first.

Club career statistics
As of 19 March 2022

Honours

Club

Busan IPark
 Korean FA Cup runner-up: 2017

Sangju Sangmu
 K League 2: 2015

International

South Korea
 EAFF East Asian Cup : 2015, 2017, 2019
 AFC Asian Cup runner-up: 2015

Individual
K League 2 Best XI : 2017

References

External links 

Lee Jeong-hyeop – National Team Stats at KFA 

1991 births
Living people
Association football forwards
Sportspeople from Busan
South Korean footballers
South Korea international footballers
Busan IPark players
Gimcheon Sangmu FC players
Ulsan Hyundai FC players
K League 1 players
K League 2 players
J1 League players
Shonan Bellmare players
Gyeongnam FC players
2015 AFC Asian Cup players